In continuum mechanics, Whitham's averaged Lagrangian method – or in short Whitham's method – is used to study the Lagrangian dynamics of slowly-varying wave trains in an inhomogeneous (moving) medium.
The method is applicable to both linear and non-linear systems. As a direct consequence of the averaging used in the method, wave action is a conserved property of the wave motion. In contrast, the wave energy is not necessarily conserved, due to the exchange of energy with the mean motion. However the total energy, the sum of the energies in the wave motion and the mean motion, will be conserved for a time-invariant Lagrangian. Further, the averaged Lagrangian has a strong relation to the dispersion relation of the system.

The method is due to Gerald Whitham, who developed it in the 1960s. It is for instance used in the modelling of surface gravity waves on fluid interfaces, and in plasma physics.

Resulting equations for pure wave motion
In case a Lagrangian formulation of a continuum mechanics system is available, the averaged Lagrangian methodology can be used to find approximations for the average dynamics of wave motion – and (eventually) for the interaction between the wave motion and the mean motion – assuming the envelope dynamics of the carrier waves is slowly varying. Phase averaging of the Lagrangian results in an averaged Lagrangian, which is always independent of the wave phase itself (but depends on slowly varying wave quantities like wave amplitude, frequency and wavenumber). By Noether's theorem, variation of the averaged Lagrangian  with respect to the invariant wave phase  then gives rise to a conservation law:

 

This equation states the conservation of wave action – a generalization of the concept of an adiabatic invariant to continuum mechanics – with

 

being the wave action  and wave action flux  respectively. Further  and  denote space and time respectively, while  is the gradient operator. The angular frequency  and wavenumber  are defined as

 

and both are assumed to be slowly varying. Due to this definition,  and  have to satisfy the consistency relations:

The first consistency equation is known as the conservation of wave crests, and the second states that the wavenumber field  is irrotational (i.e. has zero curl).

Method
The averaged Lagrangian approach applies to wave motion – possibly superposed on a mean motion – that can be described in a Lagrangian formulation. Using an ansatz on the form of the wave part of the motion, the Lagrangian is phase averaged. Since the Lagrangian is associated with the kinetic energy and potential energy of the motion, the oscillations contribute to the Lagrangian, although the mean value of the wave's oscillatory excursion is zero (or very small).

The resulting averaged Lagrangian contains wave characteristics like the wavenumber, angular frequency and amplitude (or equivalently the wave's energy density or wave action). But the wave phase itself is absent due to the phase averaging. Consequently, through Noether's theorem, there is a conservation law called the conservation of wave action.

Originally the averaged Lagrangian method was developed by Whitham for slowly-varying dispersive wave trains. Several extensions have been made, e.g. to interacting wave components, Hamiltonian mechanics, higher-order modulational effects, dissipation effects.

Variational formulation
The averaged Lagrangian method requires the existence of a Lagrangian describing the wave motion. For instance for a field , described by a Lagrangian density  the principle of stationary action is:

with  the gradient operator and  the time derivative operator. This action principle results in the Euler–Lagrange equation:

which is the second-order partial differential equation describing the dynamics of  Higher-order partial differential equations require the inclusion of higher than first-order derivatives in the Lagrangian.

Example 
For example, consider a non-dimensional and non-linear Klein–Gordon equation in one space dimension :

This Euler–Lagrange equation emerges from the Lagrangian density:

The small-amplitude approximation for the Sine–Gordon equation corresponds with the value  For  the system is linear and the classical one-dimensional Klein–Gordon equation is obtained.

Slowly-varying waves

Slowly-varying linear waves
Whitham developed several approaches to obtain an averaged Lagrangian method. The simplest one is for slowly-varying linear wavetrains, which method will be applied here.

The slowly-varying wavetrain –without mean motion– in a linear dispersive system is described as:

where  is the real-valued wave phase,  denotes the absolute value of the complex-valued amplitude  while  is its argument and  denotes its real part.

Now, by definition, the angular frequency  and wavenumber vector  are expressed as the time derivative and gradient of the wave phase  as:

 and 

As a consequence,  and  have to satisfy the consistency relations:

 and 

These two consistency relations denote the "conservation of wave crests", and the irrotationality of the wavenumber field.

Because of the assumption of slow variations in the wave train – as well as in a possible inhomogeneous medium and mean motion – the quantities     and  all vary slowly in space  and time  – but the wave phase  itself does not vary slowly.

 and 

Slowly-varying non-linear waves

Several approaches to slowly-varying non-linear wavetrains are possible. One is by the use of Stokes expansions, used by Whitham to analyse slowly-varying Stokes waves. A Stokes expansion of the field  can be written as:

where the amplitudes   etc. are slowly varying, as are the phases   etc.

 and

These approximations are to be applied in the Lagrangian density , and its phase average

Averaged Lagrangian for slowly-varying waves

For pure wave motion the Lagrangian  is expressed in terms of the field  and its derivatives.  In the averaged Lagrangian method, the above-given assumptions on the field  –and its derivatives– are applied to calculate the Lagrangian. The Lagrangian is thereafter averaged over the wave phase :

The averaged Lagrangian density  is now proposed by Whitham to follow the average variational principle:

From the variations of  follow the dynamical equations for the slowly-varying wave properties.

Example 

For linear wave motion the averaged Lagrangian is obtained by setting  equal to zero.

Set of equations emerging from the averaged Lagrangian

Applying the averaged Lagrangian principle, variation with respect to the wave phase  leads to the conservation of wave action:

since  and  while the wave phase  does not appear in the averaged Lagrangian density  due to the phase averaging. 

 and 

Variation with respect to the amplitude  leads to the dispersion relation

Example 

Continuing with the nonlinear Klein–Gordon equation, using the average variational principle on equation , the wave action equation becomes by variation with respect to the wave phase 

and the nonlinear dispersion relation follows from variation with respect to the amplitude 

Mean motion and pseudo-phase

Conservation of wave action
The averaged Lagrangian is obtained by integration of the Lagrangian over the wave phase. As a result, the averaged Lagrangian only contains the derivatives of the wave phase  (these derivatives being, by definition, the angular frequency and wavenumber) and does not depend on the wave phase itself. So the solutions will be independent of the choice of the zero level for the wave phase. Consequently – by Noether's theorem – variation of the averaged Lagrangian  with respect to the wave phase results in a conservation law:

where
 
 

with  the wave action and  the wave action flux. By definition, the group velocity  is given by:

Note that in general the energy of the wave motion does not need to be conserved, since there can be an energy exchange with a mean flow. The total energy – the sum of the energies of the wave motion and the mean flow – is conserved (when there is no work by external forces and no energy dissipation).

Conservation of wave action is also found by applying the generalized Lagrangian mean (GLM) method to the equations of the combined flow of waves and mean motion, using Newtonian mechanics instead of a variational approach.

Conservation of energy and momentum

Connection to the dispersion relation

Pure wave motion by linear models always leads to an averaged Lagrangian density of the form:

Consequently, the variation with respect to amplitude:  gives

So this turns out to be the dispersion relation for the linear waves, and the averaged Lagrangian for linear waves is always the dispersion function  times the amplitude squared.

with the slow variables  and

References

Notes

Publications by Whitham on the method

An overview can be found in the book:
 

Some publications by Whitham on the method are:

Further reading

 
 
 
 
 
 
 
 
 
 
 
 
 
 
 
 

Continuum mechanics
Lagrangian mechanics